Wójcin may refer to:

Wójcin, Mogilno County in Kuyavian-Pomeranian Voivodeship (north-central Poland)
Wójcin, Lower Silesian Voivodeship (south-west Poland)
Wójcin, Radziejów County in Kuyavian-Pomeranian Voivodeship (north-central Poland)
Wójcin, Żnin County in Kuyavian-Pomeranian Voivodeship (north-central Poland)
Wójcin, Opoczno County in Łódź Voivodeship (central Poland)
Wójcin, Wieruszów County in Łódź Voivodeship (central Poland)
Wójcin, West Pomeranian Voivodeship (north-west Poland)